Miss Sing Tao pageant is hosted by Sing Tao Daily in San Francisco, CA since 2003.  A Cover Girl is chosen by judges every month as contestants to compete in the final competition.  The final competition is usually held in December of each year.  Winners of the month and year-end pageant will represent as ambassadors of Sing Tao Daily and the Chinese-American community in public events and appearances.

Eligibility and Instructions
All applicants must be at least 15 years of age, full/part Chinese, never been married or pregnant, and have legal residency in the United States. 
Applications packets must include:
 A completed application form achievable in the Sing Tao Daily Western Edition publications 
 Two recent 4R photographs, one full body and one profile shot 
 Applicant’s resume in Chinese and/or English
 300 – 500-word introductory cover letter
 Application fee
All applications will be carried over every month until December.
Rules are (or can be) changed at any time and applicants will not be informed individually.Please refer to Sing Tao Daily Western Edition for updates and contact information.
The contestant must not be the employee (or his/her family member) of Sing Tao Daily News Group.

Preliminary Competition
Judges will select a contestant every month to proceed in the Final Competition. Each contestant will be featured as a Monthly Cover Girl (Titleholder) on the Sing Tao Weekly Magazine with additional interviews on Sing Tao Daily and singtao. TV, receives exquisite gifts, and be printed in the following year's Sing Tao Cover Girl Calendar.

Final Competition
All 12 Cover Girls within each year will compete in the Final Competition hosted in December. They will be judged in three mandatory segments (opening number and introduction; sports and lifestyle; and on-stage question in evening wear) and an optional talent segment.

Pageant Titleholders

Monthly Titleholders

Titleholders' Progress in National Pageants

Miss Chinatown USA

(*) Sponsored by Sing Tao Daily

Miss Asian Global/America

(*) Sponsored by Sing Tao Daily
- Note: Starting 2012, the Miss Asian America Pageant expanded to become the Miss Asian Global Pageant where delegates around the world can vie for the title.

Miss National Asia

Miss America

Titleholders' Progress in International Pageants

Miss Chinese Cosmos

Miss Chinese International

References

External links
 Sing Tao Cover Girl Page
 2016 Cover Girls
 1 2 3 4 5 6 7 8 9 10 11 12 
 2015 Cover Girls
 1 2 3 4 5 6 7 8 9 10 11 12
 2014 Cover Girls
 1 2 3 4 5 6 7 8 9 10 11 12
 2013 Cover Girls
 1 2 3 4 5 6 7 8 9 10 11 12
 2012 Cover Girls
 1 2 3 4 5 6 7 8 9 10 11 12
 2011 Cover Girls
 2010 Cover Girls
 2009 Cover Girls
 2008 Cover Girls
 2007 Cover Girls
 2006 Cover Girls
 1 2 3 4 5 6 7 8 9 10 11 12
 Official Website
USA

Beauty pageants in the United States